NA-7 Lower Dir-IIis a constituency for the National Assembly of Pakistan. It was created in 2018 by splitting NA-34 (Lower Dir) which contained most of Lower Dir District from 1977 to 2018. It contains Lal Qila Tehsil, Samarbagh Tehsil, Munda Tehsil, and Balambut Tehsil (excluding Balambut and Rabat union councils) of the Lower Dir District while the remaining portion of NA-34 (Lower Dir) was made part of NA-6 (Lower Dir-I).

Members of Parliament

Since 2018: NA-7 Lower Dir-II

2018 general election 

General elections were held on 25 July 2018.

†JI and JUI-F contested as part of MMA

By-election 2023 
A by-election will be held on 19 March 2023 due to the resignation of Muhammad Bashir Khan, the previous MNA from this seat.

See also
NA-6 Lower Dir-I
NA-8 Bajaur

References 

7
7